The 1971 Nebraska vs. Oklahoma football game was the 51st edition of the rivalry, one of several labeled as a "Game of the Century." The Big Eight Conference matchup was held on Thursday, November 25, 1971, in Norman, Oklahoma.

The top-ranked Nebraska Cornhuskers, defending national champions with a 20-game winning streak (and 29 without a loss), traveled south to play the second-ranked Oklahoma Sooners. In a game that lived up to the hype, the Cornhuskers scored a late touchdown to defeat the Sooners by four,

Background
The teams combined for 17 of 22 first-team All-Big Eight players. Nebraska had the nation’s top-ranked defense. Oklahoma had the nation's most productive offense with their wishbone averaging over 472 rushing yards per game, an NCAA record.
 
The cover of Sports Illustrated (November 22) prior to the game included photographs of Nebraska linebacker Bob Terrio and Oklahoma running back Greg Pruitt, nose-to-nose, beneath the headline: "Irresistible Oklahoma Meets Immovable Nebraska." Both teams had twelve days to prepare, as neither had played on the preceding Saturday.

The Husker "Blackshirts" defense included seven first-team All-Big Eight selections, four players who would earn consensus All-America recognition during their careers and two Outland Trophy winners: tackle Larry Jacobson and middle guard Rich Glover. Glover would win both the Outland and Lombardi awards in 1972 and eventually be inducted into the College Football Hall of Fame. They were joined in the starting lineup by end Willie Harper, like Glover, a two-time All-American. John Dutton, an All-American in 1973, was a sophomore backup.

The Sooners' record-setting wishbone attack was led by All-American QB Jack Mildren who rushed for over 1,000 yards, but was also a very good passer. His weapons were Heisman candidate HB Greg Pruitt, who averaged a stunning 9.5 yards per carry and speedy split end Jon Harrison. Future College Football Hall of Famer Tom Brahaney was the anchor at center.

The Husker offense was led by junior flanker Johnny Rodgers, a future Heisman Trophy winner, senior quarterback Jerry Tagge, and bullish senior tailback Jeff Kinney; the latter two were first round picks in the 1972 NFL Draft. The Sooner defense was anchored by all-Big 8 defensive tackle Derland Moore, a future All-American and NFL Pro Bowler.

With a kickoff shortly before 3 pm EST, ABC-TV broadcast the game nationally to an estimated 55 million viewers (at the time the largest television audience ever for a college football game). Chris Schenkel did the play-by-play, color analysis was provided by Oklahoma's legendary former coach, Bud Wilkinson, with Bill Flemming reporting from the sidelines. Before the game, Schenkel and Wilkinson emerged from the tunnel leading to the field, and when the Oklahoma crowd spotted Wilkinson, they erupted into applause. They came to their feet with admiration for the Minnesota-born coach who had guided the Sooners to prominence with three national championships and an NCAA record 47-game winning streak in the 1950s.

The game was played at Owen Field in Norman on Thanksgiving Day. Not only at stake was the Big Eight title, but also the #1 national ranking in the polls. However, the bowl trips had already been determined before the game, with Nebraska going to the Orange in Miami and Oklahoma headed for the Sugar in New Orleans. Two days after Thanksgiving, #5 Auburn (9–0) with Heisman Trophy winner Pat Sullivan at quarterback, faced #3 Alabama (10–0) at Birmingham for the SEC title, the two opponents that Oklahoma and Nebraska would play. Given the magnitude of the game, Devaney had even had his players' food flown in from Lincoln, in case gamblers attempted to induce a hotel chef to give the Huskers food poisoning.

Game

Summary
The game went back and forth, with three lead changes in the second half, after Oklahoma took its first lead of the game, 17–14, with five seconds left to play in the first half. Oklahoma would go ahead once more, 31–28 with 7:10 left in the game, but Nebraska then answered with a 74-yard drive for the winning touchdown with 1:38 left. At that point, Nebraska had scored touchdowns on three of its last four possessions to secure a 35–31 victory.

First half
The first half was atypical for both teams, as the Huskers' potent offense was stymied by the underrated Sooner defense; meanwhile, the Sooners devastating wishbone offense was blunted by the brutal Nebraska defense, as the Sooners lost the ball on fumbles a total of three times (twice in the first half) and were continually frustrated by Husker middle guard Rich Glover, who ended  up with twenty-two tackles on the day, despite lining up across from All-American OU center Tom Brahaney.

The Cornhuskers struck first, with Rodgers shocking the Sooners with a 72-yard punt return for a touchdown after the Sooners' first possession was stopped. The punt return remains one of college football's signature moments.

Oklahoma answered with a field goal before the teams exchanged touchdown drives – first Nebraska to take a 14–3 lead (the largest of the day), then Oklahoma, to make the score 14–10 Nebraska with 5:40 to play in the first half.

Relying almost entirely on Jack Mildren's arm and legs, the Sooners grabbed a 17–14 lead on two long passes from Mildren to Harrison with five seconds left before halftime.  For the first time all season, the Cornhuskers trailed.

Second half
Relying on a power running game, the Huskers scored two touchdowns (the first aided by the Sooners' third lost fumble of the game) to lead, 28–17, with 3:38 to play in the third quarter. Mildren then led the Sooners back with a pair of touchdowns, and Oklahoma was ahead  with 7:10 to play.

The Huskers got the ball back on their own 26-yard line. On a play starting from the Oklahoma 48, Husker quarterback Jerry Tagge threw to Rodgers, who broke tackles and ran all the way to the 15. Sacks of Mildren on third and fourth down in Sooner territory finished the game off as a Nebraska win.

Scoring summary

Statistics
{| class=wikitable style="text-align:center"
! Statistics !!  Nebraska  !! Oklahoma
|-
|align=left|First downs	||19	||22
|-
|align=left|Rushes–yards||59–297||64–279
|-
|align=left|Passing yards||65	||188
|-
|align=left|Passes||6–13–0||6–11–0
|-
|align=left|Total yards	||362	||467
|- 
|- 
|align=left|Fumbles lost ||1	||3
|-
|-
|align=left|Penalties–yards||1–5	||0–0
|-
|}

Officials
*Referee: Vance Carlson

*Umpire: John Keck

*Linesman: Wendell Winkler

*Field Judge: Chet Laney

*Back Judge: Skip Meyerfield

*Alternate: John McClintock

The six-official system was not adopted by colleges until the Big Ten did so in 1972. In 1973, all other major conferences went to six officials, adding the line judge. The seven-official system (adding the side judge) was adopted in 1985, and in 2015, the eight-official system (adding the center judge) was mandated.

Aftermath
This game, much more than the previous year's national championship, made Nebraska a program with a national following.  Already having sold every seat available at their Memorial Stadium since coach Bob Devaney arrived in 1962, they would be a perennial national championship contender and a frequent presence on national TV.

The Cornhuskers had one more regular season game to play, venturing well southwest to Honolulu to crush  Hawaii 45–3. Nebraska then traveled southeast to the Orange Bowl in Miami and soundly defeated the #2 Alabama Crimson Tide 38–6 on New Year's Day night for consecutive national titles.

Devaney returned in 1972 hoping to win three consecutive national championships, but was derailed by a season-opening road loss to UCLA, as well as a tie at Iowa State and a 17–14 loss at home to Oklahoma in Lincoln. He retired right after routing Notre Dame  in the Orange Bowl. Continuing as Nebraska's athletic director, he promoted 35-year-old assistant Tom Osborne, who led the program for a quarter century 

Pruitt did not win the Heisman, which went to quarterback Pat Sullivan of Auburn; the announcement came only hours after the conclusion of the Nebraska-Oklahoma game. The Sooners ended the regular season by destroying Oklahoma State in Stillwater 

By coincidence, Auburn was Oklahoma's opponent in the Sugar Bowl, and the Sooners won  (By another coincidence, these two arch-rivals, Nebraska and Oklahoma, played each half of another rivalry, Alabama and Auburn, and beat them both.)

Despite the loss, Oklahoma's program was also relaunched by this game, and were a perennial national contender throughout the 1970s up until Barry Switzer's departure in the late 1980s. Head coach Chuck Fairbanks left the Sooners after the 1972 season for the NFL's New England Patriots, and offensive coordinator Barry Switzer was promoted. Over the next 16 seasons (1973–88), he compiled a 157–29–4 record and guided the Sooners to national championships in 1974, 1975, and 1985.

The top three teams in the final AP poll for the 1971 season were from the Big Eight: Nebraska, Oklahoma, and Colorado. The top two teams had never been from the same conference, and this year had three.

Nebraska vs. Oklahoma, considered a minor rivalry before the Game of the Century (of 1971), became one of the biggest in the country, usually played on the day after Thanksgiving. Oklahoma still played Oklahoma State after playing Nebraska until 1979, when the game vs. the Cornhuskers became the Sooners' regular season finale (except in 1983, when the Sooners played at Hawaii on the first Saturday of December; and 1985, when Oklahoma played Oklahoma State and SMU after the Nebraska game due to television commitments).

A scandal caught up with Oklahoma in the late 1980s, sending it into a decline and forcing Switzer's resignation in June 1989. That coincided with the rise of the football program at Colorado, which replaced Oklahoma as Nebraska's Thanksgiving Friday opponent in 1996 due to the formation of the Big 12 conference (leading to the end of the annual Nebraska-Oklahoma matchup as the two were placed in opposite divisions).

The Big Eight added the four most prominent Southwest Conference schools (Texas, Texas A&M, Texas Tech, Baylor) to become the Big 12 Conference in 1996. Since one of those four was Texas, already a major non-conference rival with Oklahoma, the UT-OU rivalry game in Dallas grew in importance as they became division foes. Oklahoma and Oklahoma State were put in the South Division, while Nebraska and the other five Big 8 teams went into the North Division. Now in different divisions, NU and OU only played each other twice every four seasons, which significantly diminished the rivalry, while the OU-OSU rivalry game was returned to the end of the regular season and became more competitive (the Big 12 did not assign permanent cross-divisional opponents in contrast to the Southeastern Conference, which has done so since going to divisional play in 1992)

Oklahoma bottomed out in the second half of the 1990s, going 5-5-1 under Howard Schnellenberger in 1995, then suffering three consecutive losing seasons under John Blake. The Sooners returned to glory under Bob Stoops, who replaced Blake in 1999. Stoops guided Oklahoma to the 2000 national championship and compiled a 190-48 record in 18 seasons, winning the Big 12 championship nine times. The Sooners continued their dominance under Lincoln Riley, winning the Big 12 championship in each of his first four seasons until finishing third behind Baylor and Oklahoma State in 2021. Riley surprisingly departed Oklahoma after the 2021 regular season to become the head coach of the USC Trojans.

Nebraska left the Big 12 in the summer of 2011 to join the Big Ten Conference. The Cornhuskers endured their worst season in six decades in 2021, going 3-9 overall and 1-8 in conference play under coach Scott Frost, the starting quarterback for Nebraska's most recent national championship team in 1997.

The Sooners and Huskers met in the final Big 12 championship game in 2010, with OU winning 23–20 on December 4. The schools agreed in 2012 to play a home-and-home series in 2021 and 2022. The 2021 game, a 23-16 Oklahoma victory, was played at Norman to commemorate the fiftieth anniversary of the 1971 classic, with the following year in Lincoln. The Sporting News named the 1971 Cornhusker team as the greatest team of the 20th century in 1988.

It is unlikely future meetings will be scheduled after 2022. Oklahoma announced in July 2021 it was departing the Big 12 for the Southeastern Conference no later than 2025 (along with Texas), while the Big Ten soon thereafter entered into a scheduling alliance with the Atlantic Coast and Pacific-12 conferences to begin in 2024.

See also 
 Nebraska–Oklahoma football rivalry

References

External links
HuskerMax.com – Nebraska at Oklahoma – November 25, 1971

1971 Big Eight Conference football season
vs. Oklahoma 1971
vs. Nebraska 1971
November 1971 sports events in the United States
1971 in sports in Oklahoma
Nicknamed sporting events